The 2021 Open Montpellier Méditerranée Métropole Hérault is a professional women's tennis tournament played on outdoor clay courts. It is the fifteenth edition of the tournament which is part of the 2021 ITF Women's World Tennis Tour. It takes place in Montpellier, France between 28 June and 4 July 2021.

Singles main-draw entrants

Seeds

 1 Rankings are as of 21 June 2021.

Other entrants
The following players received wildcards into the singles main draw:
  Salma Djoubri
  Léolia Jeanjean
  Carole Monnet

The following player received entry using a protected ranking:
  Yuan Yue

The following player received entry as a junior exempt:
  Diane Parry

The following player received entry as a special exempt:
  Elsa Jacquemot

The following players received entry from the qualifying draw:
  Valentina Ivakhnenko
  Guiomar Maristany
  Yana Morderger
  Yuriko Lily Miyazaki
  Sada Nahimana
  Oksana Selekhmeteva
  Dalila Spiteri
  Margot Yerolymos

Champions

Singles

 Anhelina Kalinina def.  Mayar Sherif, 6–2, 6–3

Doubles

  Estelle Cascino /  Camilla Rosatello def.  Liang En-shuo /  Yuan Yue, 6–3, 6–2

References

External links
 2022 Open Montpellier Méditerranée Métropole Hérault at ITFtennis.com
 Official website

2021 ITF Women's World Tennis Tour
2021 in French tennis
June 2021 sports events in France
July 2021 sports events in France
Open Montpellier Méditerranée Métropole Hérault